edgelab (typically expressed with a leading lowercase "e") is an applied academic research lab, established in 2000 as a partnership between General Electric and the University of Connecticut.

edgelab approaches GE Businesses three times per year, identifying key strategic initiatives for program execution.  15 projects are selected each year (five per semester) and students, faculty, and on-site GE staff work on these projects full-time for the 13-week session.

The edgelab program was discontinued in Spring 2011. The School of Business and General Electric have announced their plans to continue the relationship by creating a new joint venture.

References

Computing and society
General Electric
Research institutes in Connecticut
University of Connecticut
Economy of Stamford, Connecticut